The Cure is the twelfth studio album by English rock band of the same name, released in June 2004 by Geffen Records. The album was entirely produced by American producer Ross Robinson and spawned the single "The End of the World".

Production and content 

The Cure was coproduced by Cure frontman Robert Smith and Ross Robinson, who had worked with bands such as Korn, Limp Bizkit, Slipknot, At the Drive-In, Glassjaw and the Blood Brothers. This may explain why the songs on the album are heavier than previous material by the band. Smith described the record as "Cure heavy", as opposed to "new-metal heavy".

According to the liner notes, the entire album was recorded live in the studio. According to Smith, the official track listing includes the closing "Going Nowhere", which was excluded from North American pressings.

Demos of three songs recorded during the album's sessions, titled "A Boy I Never Knew", "Please Come Home" and "Strum", have leaked as MP3 files. Smith explained:

The artwork was designed by Smith's nephews and nieces: children who were unaware that their drawings were to be put on the album. The drawings were supposed to be of a 'good dream' and a 'bad dream' from each niece and nephew. Smith compiled the best drawings on the album and then produced it.

Promotion 
The Cure is the first record by the band released by producer Ross Robinson's I Am label, with whom the Cure signed a three-album deal. To promote the album, the band appeared at several festivals in Europe and the United States in spring 2004. They also premièred the song "The End of the World" on The Tonight Show with Jay Leno. In the summer of 2004, the band launched the Curiosa festival, where they performed shows across the United States with a number of bands who have been inspired by the Cure, including Mogwai, Interpol and Muse. The band then performed in Mexico, followed by additional festivals and televised performances in Europe, culminating with the end of 2004. By the end of the year, every song from The Cure had been performed live by the band.

Release 
The Cure was first released in Japan on 25 June 2004. It was then released in the UK and Europe on 28 June and then in the US the day after. It debuted at No. 7 in the United States, selling 91,000 copies in its first week of release, and No. 8 in the United Kingdom.

Initial pressings included a bonus DVD containing a documentary of the conception of three songs from the album, titled Making 'The Cure.

 Reception 

Critical response to The Cure has been generally positive. Metacritic calculated the weighted average score given to The Cure at 75 out of 100. Adam Sweeting of The Guardian described it as a "masterful performance all round", highlighting the songs "The End of the World", "Going Nowhere", "Anniversary" and "The Promise". Rob Fitzpatrick of NME described it as "startling from the first listen. " Rob Sheffield of Rolling Stone wrote "it's the grooviest thing, it's a perfect dream", and pointed out the album's highlights as being "Before Three", "Lost" and "(I Don't Know What's Going) On". While stating that "as with Prince on Musicology, Smith allows the Cure's current lineup to become his own tribute band", David Browne of Entertainment Weekly nonetheless concluded that the "newly-vibrant music looks back lovingly as well on a time when Cure songs managed to combine a throbbing, oingo-boingo springiness with the depressive angst of suburban-basement isolation".

AllMusic's Stephen Thomas Erlewine was mixed in his review of The Cure, qualifying it as "the type of record that sits on the shelves of diehard fans, only occasionally making its way on the stereo". Andy Greenwald of Blender felt that the band "come off more than ever like a caricature", writing: "There are a few breaks of sunlight, including the single 'The End of the World' and 'Taking Off', a strummy echo of 1992's chart-topping Wish. After that, it's right back into the abyss." The Independents Andy Gill panned the album as being "just as stunted musically as emotionally, the bleak chordings and grey washes barely differing throughout, whatever an individual song's outlook."

 Track listing 
All lyrics written by Robert Smith; all music by the Cure (Smith, Perry Bamonte, Simon Gallup, Jason Cooper and Roger O'Donnell).Bonus DVD "Back On" (instrumental version of "Lost")
 "The Broken Promise" (instrumental version of "The Promise")
 "Someone's Coming" (alternate version of "Truth Goodness and Beauty")

 Personnel The Cure Robert Smith – vocals, guitar, production
 Perry Bamonte – guitar
 Simon Gallup – bass guitar
 Jason Cooper – drums
 Roger O'Donnell – keyboardsProduction'
 Ross Robinson – producer
 Steve Evetts -engineer, mixing

Charts

Certifications and sales

References 

2004 albums
Albums produced by Ross Robinson
Albums recorded at Olympic Sound Studios
The Cure albums
Geffen Records albums